Yevgeny Ivanovich Maskinskov (19 December 1930 – 25 January 1985) was a Soviet athlete who competed mainly in the 50 kilometre walk. He trained at the Armed Forces sports society in Saransk.

He competed for the USSR in the 1956 Summer Olympics held in Melbourne, Australia in the 50 kilometre walk where he won the silver medal.

References
Biography at sports-reference.com

1930 births
1985 deaths
Soviet male racewalkers
People from Lyambirsky District
Armed Forces sports society athletes
Athletes (track and field) at the 1956 Summer Olympics
Olympic athletes of the Soviet Union
Olympic silver medalists for the Soviet Union
Russian male racewalkers
European Athletics Championships medalists
Medalists at the 1956 Summer Olympics
Olympic silver medalists in athletics (track and field)
Sportspeople from Mordovia